Eric Chang (born 1990) is a film director and photographer, based in Los Angeles and New York.

Biography 
Eric Chang was born in East Java in February 1990. His father is a sculptor, and his mother, a ceramic designer and entrepreneur.

Photography career 
At 15 years old, he became the official photographer for Addie MS’ Twilite Orchestra and quickly became an award-winning photographer working with Indonesia’s top celebrities and public figures including: Krisdayanti, Luna Maya, and Sebastian Gunawan.
When he was 18 years old, he had his first solo exhibition, "PRIMERO", at the Intercontinental Hotel L’espace Gallery and soon after, studied at the prestigious Art Center College of Design in Pasadena, California for photography and imaging before crossing over to the film department to be under the tutelage of Ross LaManna, the screenwriter and author of the Rush Hour (film series).

In 2012, Eric was nominated for the Discovery of the Year at the 10th Annual Lucie Awards, held at the Beverly Hilton on 8 October 2012. Right after, his award-winning photographs of Arlene became a part of Sir Elton John's and David Furnish's photography collection and many other collectors.

In the beginning of 2014, Eric began his transition into the gallery world. He minimized his commercial photography projects, picking up only commissioned projects that interested him. He eventually retired from commercial photography and completely moved on to working on his own personal photography and film projects.

Since 2016, his photography can be seen in art/photo galleries and is frequently exhibited at the Georges Bergès Gallery, in SoHo, New York City.

Film career 
He worked on a short narrative film, Aexis, in the mid of 2011, teaming up with cinematographer H.R. McDonald. The film was nominated and won Best Cinematography at the American Society of Cinematographers’ 2012 Andrew Laszlo Heritage Award.

In 2012, Eric directed his experimental dance and fashion film, Lilith, where he cast choreographer and dancer Nathania Alvita, composer Deon Lee, and fashion designers Gareth Pugh and Rick Owens. The film was screened and nominated for the Academy Awards Short Films section region 1 finals at Portland Art Museum. It was also nominated for 5 awards (including Best Picture and Best Director), winning Best Creative Concept at the International Fashion Film Awards in 2013.

Since then, he has directed numerous fashion films for fashion brands and became known for his innovations of directing fashion films for other industries (other than fashion) from Industrial Design to the Adult Entertainment industry to Real Estates, Hotels and Resorts. In late 2013, he helmed an experimental project, directing a fashion film starring one of America's biggest pornographic actress, Penthouse Pet and Wicked Pictures contract star Alektra Blue. The result of the project, Blumenblatt, was released in 2015 at the Miami Short Film Festival and in limited releases at other festivals worldwide. Following that, in 2016 he partnered with Hollywood film producer Josh Chunn and Coldwell Banker's #1 Real Estate Agent in the world, Chris Cortazzo, as well as Bravo series Million Dollar Decorators star - one of the world's top interior designers Martyn Lawrence Bullard, to create a series of fashion films as a new driving platform in selling real estates and interior designs. One of the major hits, The Monk by the Sea, which was inspired by Caspar David Friedrich's painting and shot at one of Cortazzo's premier listings at Malibu's exclusive Cliffside Drive, successfully premiered at the 2017 La Jolla International Fashion Film Festival and winning the award at the International Fashion Film Awards along with 3 other nominations for Best Director, Cinematography and Music.

References 

1990 births
Living people
Indonesian emigrants to the United States
American film directors
American photographers